Education in Grenada is free and compulsory between the ages of 6 and 14 years. In 1998, the gross primary enrollment rate was 125.5 percent, while the net primary enrollment rate was 97.5 percent.  Despite the high enrollment rate, poverty, poor school facilities, and the periodic need to help with family farm harvests have resulted in approximately a 7 percent absenteeism rate among primary school children.

The Human Rights Measurement Initiative (HRMI) finds that Grenada is fulfilling only 88.7% of what it should be fulfilling for the right to education based on the country's level of income. HRMI breaks down the right to education by looking at the rights to both primary education and secondary education. While taking into consideration Grenada's income level, the nation is achieving 88.5% of what should be possible based on its resources (income) for primary education and 88.9% for secondary education.

References 

 
Society of Grenada